This article lists the current magistrates and mayors, the head of government, of the 22 primary administrative divisions of the Republic of China (Taiwan). After the streamlining of provinces in 1998, local autonomous bodies including the 6 special municipalities, 13 counties and 3 provincial cities are directly administrated by the central government (Executive Yuan) according to the Local Government Act. Executive branch of the local autonomous bodies are led by a mayor or magistrate. Each mayor or magistrate is elected by the population of their corresponding division with a maximum term of four years and the possibility of reelection to one more term.

Currently, all of the mayors of special municipalities and provincial cities and all of the county magistrates in the republic have won in the 2022 mayoral and magistratical elections and were sworn into office on 25 December 2022. Of the twenty-two current incumbents, ten are women—Lu Shiow-yen in Taichung City, Huang Min-hui in Chiayi City, and Ann Kao in Hsinchu City, as well as all seven magistrates for counties in central Taiwan and along the east coast. Yang Wen-ke of Hsinchu County is the oldest official ( of age), while Hsinchu City's Ann Kao is the youngest ( old). Fourteen incumbents belong to the Kuomintang, five from the Democratic Progressive Party, one from the Taiwan People's Party, and two are non-partisan.

Magistrates and mayors

See also
 Administrative divisions of Taiwan
 List of administrative divisions of Taiwan
 Elections in Taiwan
 Politics of the Republic of China

References

External links

heads of governments
 
Taiwan